Jafar Shahidi known as Seyed Jafar Shahidi (March 21, 1919 in Borujerd, Iran – January 13, 2008 in Tehran) was a distinguished scholar of the Persian language and literature, and a renowned historian of Islam. Born in Boroujerd, Lorestan Province, Iran, Shahidi dedicated his life to Persian studies, acting as the director of the Dehkhoda Dictionary Institute and International Center for Persian Studies (ICPS), serving as the Dean of the Faculty of Literature and Humanities at the University of Tehran (UT), and mastering the fields of jurisprudence and Islamic history. As a member of the Faculty of Literature and Humanities at the University of Tehran, Shahidi specialized in the study of Persian language and literature as well as Islamic theology, jurisprudence, and history.

Shahidi was a prominent disciple of Ali Akbar Dehkhoda and Badiozzaman Forouzanfar. He served as a seminary in Qom and Najaf under notable figures such as Tabatabaei, Seyed Hossein Boroujerdi, S. Khoi A., under whom he attained his degree in ijtihad. He is most notable for his works on the Dehkhoda Encyclopedic Dictionary of the Persian language and his research in Islamic history and religion.

In his later years, he served as the President of the Dehkhoda Institute and founder of the International Center for Persian Studies (ICPS).

Life and legacy
Seyed Jafar Shahidi was born in the town of Boroujerd, Lorestan Province, Iran. His father, Mohammad Sajjadi was a leading Iranian scholar who died shortly after the birth of his son. Spending the first few years of his education in his hometown, Shahidi continued his academics in the capital city of Tehran.

In 1941, he moved to the town of Najaf, Iraq to pursue his studies in the field of Islamic jurisprudence and successfully surpassed the highest levels of education to receive the title of mujtahid. From there onward, Shahidi moved to Qom, Iran, where he was mentored by the leading scholars, most notably Ayatollah Boroujerdi. Falling ill, Shahidi resorted to the translation of Arabic in Iran alongside Doctor Sanjabi (the then Minister of Culture). He later received an offer to teach at the Abu Muslem School.

Encounters with Dr. Mohammad Moin permitted his close relationship with Ali Akbar Dehkhoda who later entrusted Shahidi as the director of the Dehkhoda Institute. In a letter to the then Minister of Culture, Ali-Akbar Dehkhoda wrote, "Shahidi is rare in his abilities as a scholar," noting that he wished to limit his hours at the institute from twenty-two to eight in order for Shahidi to be able to continue his teachings as well.

Dr. Shahidi played a pivotal role in the formation and compilation of the second largest Persian lexicon, known as the Moin Dictionary, was entrusted with the completion and publishing of the text upon Dr. Mohammad Moin's death in 1971.

In 1991, Shahidi donated his residential house to the Narmak Municipality of Tehran where it remains today as the Dr. Shahidi Public Library.

Positions 
1968: Associate Director of the Dehkhoda Dictionary Institute
1971–2007: President and Editor-in-Chief of the Dehkhoda Dictionary Institute
1989: Founder of the International Center for Persian Studies (ICPS)
1971: Co-Editor of the Moin Dictionary

Works 
As Author

Over 100 articles written in Persian and Arabic include but are not limited to:

(1945) Messianic Islam
(1948) The Crimes in History volumes I & II
(1950) The Crimes of History volume III 
(1956) Bright Light in a Dark World/The Life of Imam Sajad
(1977) In the Path Toward the House of God
(1978) Analysis of Anvari's Divan
(1979) The Uprising of Imam Hussein
(1981) The life of Hazrat-e Fatemeh
(1983) Analytical History of Islam: until the end of the Umayyad Dynasty
(1983) The life of Imam Sadeq
(1986) The life of Imam Ali 
(1986) Praise and Greif: The Eighth Imam in Persian Poetry
(1992) Arshian
(1994) An Analysis of the Masnavi
(1994) From Yesterday to Today, the Compilation of Manuscripts and Travelogues with Dr. Shokoufeh Shahidi and Dr. Hormoz Riahi
(1997) A Biography of Imam Ali 

As Translator
Nahj al-Balagha
The life of Hazrat-e Zeynab or شیرزن کربلا
Translations dually translated in the languages of Arabic, Turkish, German, and Greek include but are not limited to:
(2001) Ali or (علی بلسان علی (ع
Hossein  or (ثورة الحسین (ع
Imam Sadegh or (حیاة الامام الصادق جعفر بن محمد (ع

As Editor
(1945) براهين‌العجم

Awards 
Honorary professorship from the University of Peking
Honorary president of International Society of Persian Language and Literature Professors
Distinguished professor of The University of Tehran.
The first class science insignia from the president of Iran 
First Rank Medal - Eminent Researcher of Tehran University.
Member of Chehrehaye mandegar

See also
Iranistics
Academy of Persian Language and Literature
Seyed Karim Amiri Firuzkuhi
Amir Banoo Karimi

Notes

http://www.payvand.com/news/08/jan/1303.html

Linguists from Iran
20th-century Iranian historians
People from Borujerd
University of Tehran alumni
1919 births
2008 deaths
Iranian Shia scholars of Islam
Persian-language writers
Recipients of the Order of Knowledge
20th-century linguists
Iran's Book of the Year Awards recipients
Faculty of Letters and Humanities of the University of Tehran alumni
Iranian expatriates in Iraq